Interstate 240 may refer to:
 Interstate 240 (North Carolina), a connection into Asheville, North Carolina
 Interstate 240 (Oklahoma), a freeway on the south side of Oklahoma City
 Interstate 240 (Tennessee), a bypass of Memphis, Tennessee

40-2
2